Kay Bluhm (born 13 October 1968 in Brandenburg) is an East German-German sprint canoer who competed from the late 1980s to the late 1990s. Competing in three Summer Olympics, he won three golds (K-2 500 m: 1992, 1996; K-2 1000 m: 1992), one silver (K-2 1000 m: 1996), and one bronze (K-4 1000 m: 1988).

Bluhm also won fourteen medals at the ICF Canoe Sprint World Championships with seven golds (K-2 500 m: 1989, 1993, 1994; K-2 1000 m: 1989, 1990, 1991, 1993), four silvers (K-1 500 m: 1989, K-2 500 m: 1991, K-2 1000 m: 1995, K-2 10000 m: 1991), and three bronzes (K-2 200 m: 1994, K-2 500 m: 1990, K-4 1000 m: 1990).

References

External links
 
 

1968 births
Living people
German male canoeists
ICF Canoe Sprint World Championships medalists in kayak
Olympic canoeists of East Germany
Olympic bronze medalists for East Germany
Olympic canoeists of Germany
Olympic gold medalists for Germany
Olympic silver medalists for Germany
Olympic medalists in canoeing
Canoeists at the 1988 Summer Olympics
Canoeists at the 1992 Summer Olympics
Canoeists at the 1996 Summer Olympics
Medalists at the 1988 Summer Olympics
Medalists at the 1992 Summer Olympics
Medalists at the 1996 Summer Olympics